Senator Frost may refer to:

Daniel M. Frost (1823–1900), Missouri State Senate
Frank A. Frost (1874–1947), New York State Senate
George L. Frost (1830–1879), Wisconsin State Senate
Moses L. Frost (1871–1958), Minnesota State Senate
Rufus S. Frost (1826–1894), Massachusetts State Senate
Samuel H. Frost (1818–c. 1874), New York State Senate